Colter Wall (born June 27, 1995) is a Canadian singer, songwriter, and musician. Known for his deep, gruff baritone and narrative songwriting, Wall's music encompasses country, folk, and western styles. His self-titled debut album was released in May 2017, and his second album Songs of the Plains in October 2018. His third album, Western Swing & Waltzes and Other Punchy Songs, was released in August 2020.

Early life
Colter Wall was born in Swift Current, Saskatchewan, on June 27, 1995, the son of Tami and politician Brad Wall. His father served as the 14th premier of Saskatchewan. He has an older sister named Megan and a younger sister named Faith. He attended Swift Current Comprehensive High School and graduated in 2013. He then studied at the University of Saskatchewan in Saskatoon. He made demos of his songs while he was a student, and in 2015, he decided to take a break from his studies at the university to focus on his music career when his first EP was released.

Career
Wall recorded a seven-song EP, Imaginary Appalachia, with Jason Plumb as producer in 2015 at Studio One in Regina, Saskatchewan. He collaborated on the EP with other artists from Regina such as Belle Plaine and The Dead South. He described his music as a blend of blues, folk and Americana. The EP was released on March 9, 2015, and "The Devil Wears a Suit and Tie" was released as his first single. His music gained more attention in late 2015 when professional wrestler Brock Lesnar mentioned him as a favorite artist during an interview with "Stone Cold" Steve Austin. Songs from the album were featured in the television show Dog the Bounty Hunter, and the films Hell or High Water and Three Billboards Outside Ebbing, Missouri. The track used in the films, "Sleeping on the Blacktop", gained more than a million streams on Spotify.

In 2016, Wall opened for Lucinda Williams at the Ryman Auditorium in Nashville.  He was signed to Rick Rubin's American Songs publishing company.

His first full-length album, self-titled Colter Wall, was produced by Dave Cobb at the RCA Studio A in Nashville. Wall was accompanied by Cobb on acoustic guitar, Chris Powell on drums, Mike Webb on piano, and Robby Turner on pedal steel. The album was released on May 12, 2017 and according to Wall, most of the songs on the album are autobiographical.

His second album, Songs of the Plains, was announced in July 2018 and was released on October 12, 2018.

In June 2020, Wall announced his third album, Western Swing & Waltzes and Other Punchy Songs which was released on August 28 with independent label, La Honda Records.

Three of Wall's songs are featured in the fourth season of the Paramount series Yellowstone, including a rendition of Rex Allen's 1951 classic "Cowpoke", plus Wall's own "Plain to See Plainsman" and "Sleeping on the Blacktop".

Influences
Wall was familiar with country music growing up, as country artists such as Johnny Cash were played at home. He started learning guitar at the age of 13, playing music of rock bands such as AC/DC and Black Sabbath and Led Zeppelin. Later he became interested in old blues artists, and then started to listen to folk music. According to Wall, he first heard  Bob Dylan's song "Don't Think Twice, It's All Right" around grade 10 or 11 (aged 15 or 16), and he was inspired to start writing and singing songs instead of only playing guitar. Other early musical influences he cited include Woody Guthrie and Ramblin' Jack Elliott, and he had also expressed interest in country singers such as Gram Parsons, Townes Van Zandt, George Jones, Waylon Jennings, Willie Nelson, and Hank Williams. He also covered Marty Robbins’ hit Big Iron on his album Western Swing & Waltzes and Other Punchy Songs.

Discography

Studio albums

Extended plays

Singles
"The Devil Wears a Suit and Tie" (2015)
"Bob Fudge" / "Happy Reunion" (2019)
"Western Swing & Waltzes" (2020)
"Cypress Hills and the Big Country" / "Let's All Help the Cowboys (Sing the Blues)" (2022)

References

1995 births
Living people
Canadian folk guitarists
Canadian male guitarists
Canadian country guitarists
Canadian folk singer-songwriters
Canadian country singer-songwriters
Musicians from Saskatchewan
People from Swift Current
21st-century Canadian guitarists
21st-century Canadian male singers
Canadian Mennonites
Mennonite musicians
Canadian male singer-songwriters
Thirty Tigers artists